Filippo II Colonna (7 April 1663 – 8 November 1714) was an Italian nobleman of prominent Colonna family. He was the 9th Duke and Prince of Paliano.

Biography
Born in Rome, Filippo was the son of Don Lorenzo Onofrio Colonna, hereditary Grand Constable of the Kingdom of Naples, and Maria Mancini, a niece of Cardinal Mazarin. The Spanish had ruled Naples since the early sixteenth century, and the Colonna were prominent servants of the Spanish crown in Italy. In 1687, while his father served as head of the interregnum council of Naples, Filippo was appointed commander of a company of lancers. In 1689 he succeeded his father as Grand Constable and Duke-Prince of Paliano.

As a patron of the arts, Filippo had the art gallery in the family's Roman palazzo refurbished. He opened the gallery in 1703. The composer Giovanni Bononcini wrote six serenatas, an oratorio and five operas while in his service (1692–1697). Filippo was a member of the Academy of Arcadia, which had been established in Rome in 1690.

Among his other titles, Filippo was Prince of Castiglione, and Duke of Marino, Miraglia and Tagliacozzo. He was made a knight of the Order of the Golden Fleece by Spanish king Carlos II in 1679. In 1710 he became the first Colonna to be appointed hereditary Prince Assistant to the Papal Throne.

Don Filippo married the Spanish aristocrat Lorenza de la Cerda in Madrid in 1681, but she died without issue in 1697. Later that year in Rome he wed his second wife, the Italian aristocrat Olimpia Pamphilj (1672–1731), by whom he had several children.

The Prince suffered from painful bladder stones and diseased kidneys prior to his death at Rome in 1714. His son Fabrizio II Colonna succeeded him in his hereditary titles. Fabrizio also commissioned a tomb for his father in the church of Sant’ Andrea in the family seat of Paliano, which was executed by the sculptor Bernardino Ludovisi and installed in 1745.

References

 Robert Enggass, “Ludovisi’s Tomb for a Colonna Prince” Burlington Magazine, CXXXV (1993): 822–824.
 V. Gazzaniga & S. Marinozzi, "Nephrology in the Lancisi Medical Dictionary (1672-1720)" Journal of Nephrology, 19 (2006): 44–47.
 Baroque Composers and Musicians: Giovanni Battista Bononcini
  Opera Today: Bononcini: La nemica d’Amore fatta amante
 ( Alternative source)

Filippo II Colonna
Knights of the Golden Fleece
17th-century Italian nobility
18th-century Italian nobility
1663 births
1714 deaths